En chamade (French: "to sound a parley") refers to powerfully voiced reed stops in a pipe organ that have been mounted horizontally, rather than vertically, in the front of the organ case, projecting out into the church or concert hall.  They produce a commanding, loud trumpet-like tone, used for fanfares and solos.   It is known as Fan Trumpet, Horizontal Trumpet, and Trompette en Chamade.

Any stop mounted en chamade will be much louder than a stop elsewhere in the organ, even though in church organs the stops may stand on the same windpressure. In theatre and concert organs, en chamade stops often stand on higher windpressure than the other stops, to sound even more powerful and commanding.

History
First seen in Iberian and Mexican organs of the early eighteenth century, it came in many forms to create choruses in divided registers: the Trompeta de Batalla (8′), Bajoncillo (4′), Bajo (16′), Violeta (2′), Trompeta Magna (16′), the Claríns (either 8′ or 4′, the smaller ones in conjunction with the trompetas). Often confused with these, are the Trompeta Reales, or Trombeta Reales, which were never horizontal and were always located inside of the case.

Another example, first referred to as a trompette 'en chamade''' is located in an organ built in Provence in 1772.  The term was popularized by Aristide Cavaillé-Coll in his organs of the nineteenth century.

In modern organs, chamade stops are most often found at 8' and 4' as Trompette en Chamade and Clairon en Chamade respectively, with some examples at 16', and even rare instances at 5 1/3' (On the organ of St.Martin, Dudelange (Luxembourg), the organ of Our Lady of Lapa, Porto (Portugal) and the organ of Stiftsbasilika Waldsassen (Germany) have chamades at 16', 8', 5 1/3', and 4'). 'Chamade' is occasionally used as a stop name by itself.Chamade'' was a trumpet call designed to be heard across the battlefield in the enemy camp, (announcing a desire to surrender).

See also
List of pipe organ stops

References
Notes

Footnotes

External links
Encyclopedia of Organ Stops
Wicks Glossary of Organ Terms

Reed type organ stops